Raja Sri Brahdamba Dasa Raja Sri  Rajagopala Tondaiman Bahadur (23 June 1922 – 16 January 1997) was the ninth and last ruler of the princely state of Pudukkottai.

Early life 

Rajagopala Tondaiman was born to Prince Ramachandra Tondaiman and his second wife, Mathusri Raja Srimathi Rani Janaki Ayi Sahib, on 23 June 1922.

Reign 

On 19 November 1928, six-year-old Rajagopala Tondaiman was appointed to succeed Martanda Bhairava Tondaiman as the Raja of Pudukkottai. Raghunatha Pallavarayar served as regent until February 1929. From February 1929 to 17 January 1944, the state was governed by a council of regency appointed by the British. Rajagopala took over the administration on 17 January 1944. On 3 March 1948, Rajagopala Tondaiman acceded to the dominion of India. The princely state became a part of Trichirappalli district of the Madras Presidency.

Rajagopala Tondaiman served as the President of the Tamil Nadu Cricket Association (TNCA), Pudukottai Recreation Club (PRC) and Kodaikanal Boat and Rowing Club. He is a recipient of the George V Silver Jubilee Medal (1935), George VI Coronation Medal (1937) and Indian Independence medal (1948).

Notes 

1922 births
1997 deaths
Hindu monarchs
Pudukkottai state